Deborrea seyrigi is a species of bagworm moth native to Madagascar.

Biology
This species has a  wingspan of 23.5–31 mm. Stated flight periods are December–May and August–September.

References
 

Psychidae
Lepidoptera of Madagascar
Moths described in 1984
Moths of Madagascar
Moths of Africa